Salegentibacter salegens is a bacterium from the genus of Salegentibacter.

References

Flavobacteria
Bacteria described in 1993